Beginning with the 1863 education has been offered to the whole people, and so far as funds permit is absolutely free for all. All Armenian education is under the direction of lay committees. During this period in Russian Armenia the association of the schools with the Church is rather closer, but the same principle obtains. This became a problem for Russian administration, which was peaked during 1897, Tsar Nicholas appointed the Armenophobic Grigory Sergeyevich Golitsin as governor of Transcaucasia, and Armenian schools, cultural associations, newspapers and libraries were closed.

The Armenian charitable works, hospitals, and provident institutions we were organized along the explained perspective. The Armenians, in addition to paying taxes to the State, have voluntarily imposed extra burdens on themselves in order to support such philanthropic agencies. The taxes to the State did not have direct return to Armenians in such cases.

The education and philanthropic agencies made the Armenians most educated and rich section of the Ottoman population.

There existed over 1,996 Armenian schools with 173,022 pupils before World War I. 

The following table is the list of Armenian schools in the Ottoman Empire gives the number and statistics of Armenian schools for each geographical district in the Ottoman Empire in 1912.

See also
Historical topics:
Ottoman Armenia
Education in the Ottoman Empire
Modern topics:
Education in Turkey
Education in Armenia
List of Armenian Schools worldwide

References

External links
 

Education in the Ottoman Empire
Armenians from the Ottoman Empire